Taj Mahal  is a 2010 Indian Telugu-language film directed by Arun Singaraju and starring Sivaji and Shruti. It is a remake of the Kannada film of the same name. The film received mixed to positive reviews and the film's music was praised.

Cast 

Sivaji as Ajay 
Nushrratt Bharuccha as Shruti
Kota Srinivasa Rao
L. B. Sriram
Nassar
Brahmanandam
Pragathi
M. S. Narayana
Venu Madhav
Chitram Seenu
Raghu Babu
Jeeva
Sangeeta
Aarthi Agarwal as Maisamma (special appearance)

Production  
Hindi actress Nushrratt Bharuccha made her Telugu debut with this film under the stage name of Shruti. USA-trained  Arun Singaraju was to direct a Hyderabad Blues-esque film but changed his mind after meeting Sivaji on the sets of Indumathi (2009). Sivaji debuted as a producer with this film and he bought the remake rights after the success of the Kannada original. Aarthi Agarwal, whose career hit a low point, did an item number in the film.

Soundtrack
Music composed by Abhiman.

Reception 
Jeevi of Idlebrain.com opined that Sivaji gave "his career’s finest performance" and wrote that "On a whole, Taj Mahal is a decent movie with a message supporting parents". A critic from 123telugu wrote that "Contrary to what ‘Tajmahal’ stands for, the film drives home the point that love should take a backseat, when you have to choose between love and parents". Prakash Upadhya of Filmibeat said that "On the whole we should appreciate the efforts of the director for experimenting a message oriented movie". A critic from Indiaglitz said that "Taj Mahal is entertaining as well as dark.  Its subject matter doesn't promise too much of heart-wrenching moments, but it sure lives up to its own test and our ordinary expectations".

References

Indian drama films
Telugu remakes of Kannada films